A kokoku or kokoku tokkyo koho is an examined and approved Japanese patent application, published for opposition, in contrast to the kokai, the published ("laid-open"), unexamined Japanese patent application. The kokoku system of publishing for opposition was abolished in 1996.

See also 
 Japanese patent law

References 

Japanese patent law